The Obock Region is a region in northern Djibouti. It has a land area of 4,700 square kilometres (1,800 sq mi), and had a population of 37,856 in 2009.  It lies along the Red Sea, Bab-el-Mandeb, Gulf of Aden, Gulf of Tadjoura and includes the Seven Brothers, Doumeira Islands and the coastal city of Obock. It lies along a portion of the national border with Eritrea. In total area, it is larger than Cape Verde and smaller than Trinidad and Tobago. The topography of the region has highland and coastal plains.

History
In the mid-19th century and earlier, Obock was ruled by Afar Sultans, local authorities with whom France signed various treaties between 1883 and 1887 to first gain a foothold in the region. The March 11, 1862 agreement the Afar sultan, Raieta Dini Ahmet signed in Paris was a treaty where the Afars sold the territory of Obock for 10,000 thalaris, around 55,000 francs. The French developed Obock as a colonial port, while the Italians maintained a port to the north of Obock at Assab.

Obock region became a separate administrative entity in 1927, with Michel Azenor appointed as chief.

Geography
It is bordered by Eritrea to the north, the Tadjourah Region to the southwest, and the Red Sea and Gulf of Aden to the east. There are several salt-lakes on the road to Tadjoura.

The regional capital is Obock which is positioned on the Gulf of Tadjoura littoral, by the sea, by a group of beaches and flattened abraded in coral beds with a very salty sheet of water. The wooded area of the Mabla Mountains, reaching more than 1,000 m and housing the second forest of the country, constitutes the natural border between the region of Obock and that of Tadjourah. The coastline is more than a thousand kilometers long. Obock with its proximity to Yemen (less than two hours). The city has a functional airstrip and offers regular ferry services to Djibouti City. The wildlife such as hamadryas baboons, Soemmerring's gazelle, dorcas gazelle, warthog, black-backed jackal, Ruppells sandfox, dikdik, African golden wolf, hyena, Abyssinian hare, wild ass and ostriches are found in this region. African wild dog was also found in this region, but their present condition is unknown. There have been reports of cheetah occurring in this region, but there has been no evidence of their presence.

Economy
The region is characterized mainly by an activity oriented towards animal production (goat and dromedary farming), and agricultural activities in irrigated areas and artisanal fishing along the entire length of its coastline. The practice of small business and other informal activities is also widespread in the town of Obock and in the main localities. The number of salaried jobs is quite limited. The 200 fishermen of Obock are relatively well organized as part of their Association of Fishermen Cooperatives of Obock.

Climate
The region is characterized by two seasons. The cool season, which runs from November to April, and the warm season which begins in May and is often more or less dry. The rare and low rainfall and endemic drought make this area one of the driest places in the country. The effects of climate change are also being felt. Sometimes it is hot and dry and sooner or later than usual. Sometimes it makes cool and wet longer or shorter, later or earlier than expected.

The annual mean statistics for some Tadjoura Region centres is shown below:

Towns

References

 
Regions of Djibouti